John Korir (also John Kipsang Korir; born December 15, 1975) is a Kenyan athlete who specializes in road running. 

John Korir was born in 1975 in Mulot village, Bomet District. He represents Kipsigis people, a Kalenjin sub-tribe.
 
He is not to be confused with John Cheruiyot Korir, a runner born in 1981 who has represented Kenya at the Olympics and various other championships. The two have competed against each other a couple of times. At the 2002 Lisbon Half Marathon, the older Korir was better, while John Cheruiyot Korir beat his namesake at a cross country event in Kenya in 2003. At the 2005 Cherry Blossom 10-Mile Run, John Cheruiyot Korir was fifth in an event won by his older namesake.

He trains with Kimbia Athletics and is coached by Dieter Hogen.

Achievements 
Korir has won several road races, including:
Peachtree Road Race (2001)
Cherry Blossom 10-Mile Run (2003, 2005)
World's Best 10K (2004, 2005)
Bix 7 (1998, 1999, 2001, 2003, 2004)
Bellin Run (2005, 2006, 2007, 2008, 2010)
Lilac Bloomsday Run (2003, 2005, 2007)
Bay to Breakers (2007, 2008)
Steamboat Classic (2006, 2007)

Personal bests 
Track
5000 metres - 13:34.41 (1999)
10,000 metres - 28:13.52 (2007)
Road
10 kilometres - 27:47 min (2004)
15 kilometres - 42:57 (2001)
10 miles - 46:12 min (2001)
Half Marathon - 60:47 min (2004)

References

External links

Kimbia.net
Interview with John Korir

1975 births
Living people
Kenyan male long-distance runners
People from Bomet County